True Bangkok United Football Club is a Thai professional football club based in Pathum Thani province. Formerly known as Bangkok University Football Club until 2009. The club was relegated from the 2010 Thai Premier League only 4 years after winning their first league title in 2006. In 2012 they got promoted to Thai League 1 again, after finishing 3rd in 2012 Thai Division 1 League.

History

Origins of the club: "Bangkok University"
The club was originally formed as Bangkok University FC in 1988 as a team for students at Bangkok University's Rangsit Campus in Pathum Thani Province, just north of Bangkok, the club have gone from provincial football, and winning university-level titles, to being a professionally run outfit in the top flight in the Thai Premier League.

An era of titles
Along the way to the Top flight, they won the Thai Division 1 League in 2003 and even captured the 2006 Thailand Premier League title against the odds, which has also enabled the club to taste life in the AFC Champions League.

The club appeared in the 2007 AFC Champions League but played their home matches in the group stage away from the club's home. The first match on 7 March 2007 against Korea's Chunnam Dragons was played at the Thai-Japanese Stadium in Bangkok and the second, on 25 April against Indonesia's Arema Malang, was played at the Thai Army Sports Stadium in Bangkok, where tickets cost 50 baht. Both matches ended 0–0. The third, against Japan's Kawasaki Frontale, was played at the Thai Army Sports Stadium. The team has failed to qualify for the next stage.

Slow down
Bangkok University FC always used the Bangkok University Stadium for domestic competitions until the end of the 2008 Thailand Premier League season. The stadium was based on the Bangkok University's Rangsit Campus and had a capacity of 5,000, currently used by the club as a training ground.

2009 – Development of club's name

At the start of the 2009 season, the club changed their club name from Bangkok University to Bangkok United with a partnership with the Bangkok Metropolitan Administration (BMA) to be in line with the Football Association of Thailand's (FAT) new regulations that all teams in the top flight must be registered as limited companies. They also changed their club nickname to 'Bangkok Angels', and were officially unveiled on 4 March 2009.

Also, with this name change, the club relocated to a new stadium, the Thai-Japanese Stadium which was based further center in Greater Bangkok. The stadium is for multi-use, such as athletics and football and holds a capacity of 10,320. The stadium was also shared by Thai Port FC whilst they waited for their stadium to be upgraded. On 31 May 2009, after 5 home matches, the club returned to using Bangkok University Stadium as a home ground again until the renovations of Thai-Japanese Stadium were finished before the start of 2009 season's second leg in August. Bangkok United narrowly escaped relegation in the 2009 Thai Premier League.

2010 – New Owners
For the 2010 Thai Premier League season, United was backed by Thai media company True Corporation. The early season optimism did not last long and the 2010 campaign ended in relegation. The Angels only won two home games all season. Rather surprisingly the two victories were against high-fliers Buriram PEA and Chonburi. Incidentally, both victories were achieved at the Bangkok University Stadium after they switched their home fixtures from the Thai-Japanese Stadium to the university midway through the season.

Return to prominence

In the 2015 season, the club move to Thammasat Stadium to pass the assignment of AFC Champions League regulation.

Mano's Bangkok improved on the season before to finish fifth in the Thai Premier League. Since 2015, the club became one of big club in Thailand league. The team under German-Brazilian 
manager Alexandré Pölking has been widely praised for instilling an energetic, play with a galavanting style of attacking football reaching levels of intensity that are rarely seen in this league.

Entering the 2016 season, The Bangkok Angels ended in second place in the Thai League 1 and created history by claiming 75 points – the club's highest points in a single season. The team missed an opportunity to qualify for the AFC Champions League by failing to beat Johor Darul Ta'zim in the qualifying play-offs match.

One year later, The Bangkok Angels started winning 1–0 against Navy on the opening day. Nevertheless, The team managed to end their season on a high note by finishing third in the Thai League 1 and reaching the 2017 Thai FA Cup Final, losing 4–2 to Chiangrai United. Despite coming third, The club managed to be the league highest scorers with an impressive 97 goals from 34 games, making them the most productive team in the division by far and finishing just one short of breaking a record set by Buriram United themselves in 2015. A big contributing factor to this was the goals from attacking duo Dragan Bošković and Mario Gjurovski who netted 50 goals between them.

In the 2018 season, The team ended in second place in the Thai League 1 by claiming 71 points.

Academy & Youth
Bangkok United signed a collaboration agreement with Surasakmontree School and Bangkok Christian College. These agreements resulted in the introduction of young players from these schools joining the first team such as Sasalak Haiprakhon, Sarayut Sompim, Jakkit Wachpirom, Anusith Termmee, Nattawut Suksum, Wisarut Imura, and Guntapon Keereeleang.

Bangkok United operate Youth and Junior Youth teams as part of their academy to nurture local talent under a big project "cp-dreams." (Thai lit. ซีพี สานฝัน...ปันโอกาส).

In 2019, 7 youth players of "cp-dreams." project from Bangkok Christian College were call-ups to Thailand U-12 and they helped Thailand U-12 to finish in third place in U-12 Junior Soccer World Challenge football tournament. – beat Tokyo Verdy Junior, 2–0 beat FC Barcelona, 1-0 and beat JFA Training Center Osaka, 2–1.

Sponsors and manufacturers

Kit history

Affiliated clubs
 FC Tokyo (2017–present)
The Bangkok Angels signed a partnership agreement with FC Tokyo of the J1 League in September 2017. There is the deal to work together at developing the academy players, strengthen the bond between two teams in order to improve the over all top team level and creating a new business.

Stadium

Thammasat Stadium is a multi-purpose stadium in the city of Rangsit, Pathum Thani, Thailand.  It is currently used mostly for football matches.  The stadium holds 25,000. It is on Thammasat University's Rangsit campus. It is located close to Bangkok.

It was built for the 1998 Asian Games by construction firm Christiani and Nielsen, the same company that constructed the Democracy Monument in Bangkok.

Its appearance is that of a scaled down version of Rajamangala Stadium. The tribunes form a continuous ring which are quite low behind each goal but rise up on each side. Unlike Rajamangala though, Thammasat has a roof covering both side tribunes. Most striking about this stadium are the floodlights. Thai architects usually favour concrete pylons but these are the steel variety. As viewed from the exterior of the stadium the base of each pylon seems to grip the outside of the stadium and they dramatically lean over the tribunes so as to better illuminate the playing area.

Stadium and locations

Continental record

Performance in AFC competitions
AFC Champions League: 3 appearances
 2007: Group stage
 2017: Preliminary round 2
 2019: Preliminary round 2

Season by season record

(1), (2). Brackets with numbers inside indicates the level of division within the Thai football league system
N/A = No answer

Players

Current squad

Out on loan

Coaching staff

Coaches
Coaches by Years (2001–present)

Honours

Domestic competitions

League
 Thai League 1
 Winners (1): 2006
 Runners-up (2): 2016, 2018
 Thai Division 1 League
 Winners (1): 2002–03

Cups
 FA Cup
 Runner-up (1): 2017

References

External links
 Official Website

 
Association football clubs established in 1988
Thai League 1 clubs
Football clubs in Bangkok
Sport in Bangkok
1988 establishments in Thailand